Megalopyge defoliata is a moth of the Megalopygidae family. It was described by Francis Walker in 1855. It is found in Mexico.

The wingspan is 34 mm for males and 50 mm for females. The fringe is cream color. The hindwings are creamy with the veins and some scales at the base darker. Females are entirely smoky brown with some white scales at the base and near the apex of the forewings.

References

Moths described in 1855
Megalopygidae